Linnéa Rebecka Emilia Bäckman (born 18 April 1991) is a Swedish ice hockey defender.

International career
Bäckman was selected for the Sweden women's national ice hockey team in the 2014 Winter Olympics. She played in all six games, not recording a point.

As of 2014, Wester has also appeared for Sweden at three IIHF Women's World Championships. Her first appearance came in 2011.

As of 2014, Bäckman made two appearances for the Sweden women's national under-18 ice hockey team, at the IIHF World Women's U18 Championships in 2008 and 2009, including winning a bronze medal in the 2009 event.

Career statistics
Through 2013–14 season

References

External links
Eurohockey.com Profile
Sports-Reference Profile

1991 births
Living people
Ice hockey players at the 2014 Winter Olympics
Olympic ice hockey players of Sweden
Ice hockey people from Stockholm
Swedish women's ice hockey defencemen